Owen Hale (Born July 15, 1948) is an American musician best known for playing drums with Lynyrd Skynyrd, on their album Twenty and the Lyve from Steel Town DVD concert. Hale left the group in 1998. He was also a busy studio drummer in Nashville, TN appearing on many records by Patty Loveless, Doug Stone and Toby Keith among others.

References

External links 
 
 

1948 births
Living people
American rock drummers
Lynyrd Skynyrd members
Musicians from Louisville, Kentucky
Rock musicians from Kentucky
20th-century American drummers
American male drummers